The Vanuatu national football team is the national team of Vanuatu and is controlled by the Vanuatu Football Federation.

History
It was known as the New Hebrides national football team until the New Hebrides became Republic of Vanuatu in 1980. It finished fourth in the OFC Nations Cup in 1973, 2000, and 2002. In the 2004 Oceania Nations Cup, Vanuatu beat New Zealand 4–2, preventing the regional powerhouse from making the final and, consequently, the running for the 2006 World Cup.

Vanuatu caused another shock in the 2007 South Pacific Games by knocking out the Solomon Islands for bronze medal and also enable to enter the second stage of qualification for the OFC Nations Cup and consequently a chance with a playoff for the FIFA World Cup in South Africa in 2010. The last time they had won against Solomon Islands was back in 1998 and had since been on the receiving side of many losses save for one draw against them. In July 2008, Vanuatu faced two national teams from the Solomon Islands during the inaugural edition of the Wantok Cup. Vanuatu lost 1–2 to the Solomons' team A, but defeated their team B by two goals to one.

Kit sponsorship

Results and fixtures

In March 2022, Vanuatu played their first matches since they took part in the 2019 Pacific Games.

2022

Coaching staff

Coaching history

New Hebrides
 P. Reichert (1973–1987)
Vanuatu

  Terry O'Donnell (1987–1993)
  Saby Natonga (1996)
  Alwyn Job (1998)
  Juan Carlos Buzzetti (2000–2004)
  Joe Szekeres (2004–2007)
  Robert Calvo (2007–2008)
  Willian Malas (2008)
  Jorge Añón (2009)
  Saby Natonga (2011–2012)
  Percy Avock (2012–2015)
  Moise Poida (2015–2018)
  Etienne Mermer (2017)
  Paul Munster (2019)
  Etienne Mermer (2019–2022)
  George Amos (2022)
  Juan Carlos Buzzetti (2022)
  Emerson  Alcantara (2022-)

Current squad
The following 25 players were called up for the FIFA World Cup qualification matches in March 2022.

Caps and goals updated as of 27 March 2022, after the match against Fiji.

Player records

Players in bold are still active with Vanuatu.

Most capped players

Top goalscorers

Competitive record

FIFA World Cup

OFC Nations Cup

Pacific Games

Melanesia Cup

Wantok Cup

Head-to-head record
Up to matches played on 27 March 2022.

See also

 Vanuatu national under-15 football team
 Vanuatu national under-17 football team
 Vanuatu national under-20 football team
 Vanuatu national under-23 football team
 Vanuatu women's national football team
 Vanuatu women's national under-20 football team

References

Notes

External links
 Vanuatu at the FIFA website.
 Vanuatu at the OFC website.
 VFFFoot.over-nlog.com
 Vanuafoot – Vanuatu Football Federation Official site
 Vanuatu Football Federation Official Blog site

 
Oceanian national association football teams